Besim Kabashi (February 27, 1976 – December 4, 2011) was a Kosovar-German kickboxer who competed in the light heavyweight, cruiserweight and heavyweight divisions. He began his training in Germany after emigrating from Kosovo and initially competed as a -79 kg/174 lb fighter before moving up through the weight classes until eventually reaching heavyweight. After stints as a German and European champion, Kabashi won the WKA World Heavyweight Muay Thai title in 2008 which he held until his death in December 2011.

Early life
Kabashi was born in 1976 as the youngest of seven children to Kosovar Albanian parents near Istok, Yugoslavia, and moved to Munich, Germany at age 14. He competed in athletics, football and swimming as a youngster before he began kickboxing at age 17.

Career
After successful careers in amateur boxing and kickboxing, Kabashi turned professional in 1997 and won the WKA German Light Heavyweight (-79 kg/174 lb) Championship in his debut year. The following year her won the WKA German Super Light Heavyweight (-83.2 kg/183 lb) Championship. Despite a promising start to his career, Kabashi would then retire from the sport in 2002 following a disagreement with his trainer.

Kabashi returned to the ring in 2006, weighing in at 102 kg/224 lb. His transition to heavyweight saw him have success almost immediately as he knocked out Zoran Dorcic in round two to become the WKA European Super Heavyweight (+95 kg/209 lb) Champion in 2007. He then won the WKA World Heavyweight (-95 kg/209 lb) Muay Thai belt on December 13, 2008 when he defeated Yahya Gülay by fourth round technical knockout. Kabashi defended this title seven times over the next three years against the likes of David Dancrade and Petr Vondráček before his untimely death in December 2011.

Death
Kabashi was found dead in his apartment in Munich, Germany on Sunday December 4, 2011.

Championships and awards

Kickboxing
World Kickboxing Association
WKA German Light Heavyweight (-79 kg/174 lb) Championship
WKA German Super Light Heavyweight (-83.2 kg/183 lb) Championship
WKA European Super Heavyweight (+95 kg/209 lb) Championship
WKA World Heavyweight (-95 kg/209 lb) Muay Thai Championship

Kickboxing record 

|-
|-  bgcolor="#CCFFCC"
| 2011-05-28 || Win ||align=left| Petr Vondráček || Steko's Fight Night || Munich, Germany || TKO (punches) || 4 || 1:27
|-
! style=background:white colspan=9 |
|-
|-  bgcolor="#CCFFCC"
| 2010-12-04 || Win ||align=left| Mehmet Özer || Steko's Fight Night || Munich, Germany || TKO (punches) || 3 || 1:44
|-
! style=background:white colspan=9 |
|-
|-  bgcolor="#CCFFCC"
| 2010-09-25 || Win ||align=left| Luca Panto || Steko's Fight Night || Munich, Germany || KO (punches) || 1 || 2:07
|-
! style=background:white colspan=9 |
|-
|-  bgcolor="#CCFFCC"
| 2010-03-20 || Win ||align=left| Andrei Manzolo || Steko's Fight Night || Munich, Germany || DQ (Manzolo could not recover from a low blow) || 2 || 2:17
|-
! style=background:white colspan=9 |
|-
|-  bgcolor="#CCFFCC"
| 2009-00-00 || Win ||align=left| Li Jixiang || Steko's Fight Night || Munich, Germany || TKO (right hook) || 4 || 3:00
|-
! style=background:white colspan=9 |
|-
|-  bgcolor="#CCFFCC"
| 2009-00-00 || Win ||align=left| John Love || Steko's Fight Night || Munich, Germany || KO (right cross) || 2 || 0:59
|-
! style=background:white colspan=9 |
|-
|-  bgcolor="#CCFFCC"
| 2009-00-00 || Win ||align=left| David Dancrade || Steko's Fight Night || Munich, Germany || DQ (Dancrade struck the referee) || 2 || 2:08
|-
! style=background:white colspan=9 |
|-
|-  bgcolor="#CCFFCC"
| 2008-12-13 || Win ||align=left| Yahya Gülay || Steko's Fight Night || Munich, Germany || TKO (knees and punches) || 4 || 2:27
|-
! style=background:white colspan=9 |
|-
|-  bgcolor="#CCFFCC"
| 2008-00-00 || Win ||align=left| Corentin Jallon || Steko's Fight Night || Munich, Germany || Decision || 3 || 3:00
|-
|-  bgcolor="#CCFFCC"
| 2007-09-15 || Win ||align=left| Lazar Tomić || Steko's Fight Night || Munich, Germany || Decision || 3 || 3:00
|-
|-  bgcolor="#CCFFCC"
| 2007-00-00 || Win ||align=left| Zoran Dorčić || Steko's Fight Night || Munich, Germany || KO (right cross) || 2 || 
|-
! style=background:white colspan=9 |
|-
|-
| colspan=9 | Legend:

References

1976 births
2011 deaths
German male kickboxers
Light heavyweight kickboxers
Cruiserweight kickboxers
Heavyweight kickboxers
Albanian Muay Thai practitioners
German Muay Thai practitioners
People from Istog
Sportspeople from Munich
Kosovo Albanians
Kosovan emigrants to Germany
Drug-related deaths in Germany
Sportspeople from Peja